Ray Preston (born 27 December 1930) is a former  Australian rules footballer who played with South Melbourne in the Victorian Football League (VFL).

Preston was recruited from Shepparton club, City United in the Goulburn Valley Football League after he won the club's 1952 best and fairest award.

Preston won the 1955 Morris Medal in the Ovens & Murray Football League, with 22 votes, with Alby Rodda from Myrtleford, second on 20 votes.

Notes

External links 

A Trio of Magpie Medallists Via On Reflection

Living people
1930 births
Australian rules footballers from Victoria (Australia)
Sydney Swans players
Shepparton Football Club players